Iowa Township is one of eighteen townships in Allamakee County, Iowa, USA.  At the 2010 census, its population was 744.

History
Iowa Township was organized in 1855.

Geography
Iowa Township occupies the extreme northeast corner of the state of Iowa. According to the USGS, it contains three cemeteries: Holy Cross, New Albin and Saint Peters.

References

External links
 US-Counties.com
 City-Data.com

Townships in Allamakee County, Iowa
Townships in Iowa
1855 establishments in Iowa
Populated places established in 1855